Abdulaziz Damdam (born 18 June 1995) is a Saudi Arabian professional footballer who plays as a midfielder for Al-Riyadh.

Career
Damdam started his career at the youth team of Al-Ahli and represented the club at every level except the senior level. On 7 August 2019, Damdam joined First Division side Al-Mujazzal. On 24 September 2020, Damdam joined Saudi Professional League side Al-Batin on a two-year deal. On 3 August 2022, Damdam joined Al-Riyadh on a free transfer.

References

External links
 

1995 births
Living people
Sportspeople from Jeddah
Saudi Arabian footballers
Association football midfielders
Al-Ahli Saudi FC players
Al-Mujazzal Club players
Al Batin FC players
Al-Riyadh SC players
Saudi First Division League players
Saudi Professional League players